WZBQ (94.1 FM, "94.1 ZBQ") is a Top 40 (CHR) music formatted radio station licensed to Carrollton, Alabama, with studios located in Tuscaloosa. The station is owned by iHeartMedia.

WZBQ serves west-central Alabama and most of east-central Mississippi with an ERP of 98,000 Watts, broadcasting at 94.1 MHz.  The station was formerly the Tuscaloosa FM affiliate of the Alabama Crimson Tide football network.  Cities in WZBQ's primary coverage area include Tuscaloosa, Carrollton, Aliceville and Fayette in Alabama and Columbus and Starkville in Mississippi.

History
The station signed on as WWAG on February 1, 1970.  In 1973, the station changed call letters to WAQT, then in 1990 to WCKO.  The station took the oldies format and call letters of Z-102 (102.5 FM) in Jasper when that station began targeting the Birmingham 
market in 1987.  In 1988, the station switched formats and adopted its current Top 40 programming. The very popular nationally syndicated morning show "Steve & DC" became partners at WZBQ-FM in the late 1980s. They were later syndicated to WZBQ from their base in St. Louis, Mo. Popular Birmingham DJ Coyote J Calhoun (WERC 1974-1979) was hired from WQUE FM New Orleans to do 7pm to 12 midnight.

References

External links
WZBQ official website

ZBQ
Contemporary hit radio stations in the United States
IHeartMedia radio stations
Radio stations established in 1970
1970 establishments in Alabama